Thud or THUD may refer to:

Arts and entertainment
 Thud, a fictional character in the animated film A Bug's Life (1998)
 Thud, a fictional character in the animated film series The Land Before Time (1988–2016)
 Thud (album), a 1995 rock album by Kevin Gilbert
 Thud (game), a 2002 board game inspired by Terry Pratchett's Discworld series
 Thud!, a 2005 Discworld novel by Terry Pratchett
 Thud!, a 1997 children's book by Nick Butterworth

Other
 F-105 Thunderchief, a U.S. fighter-bomber, nicknamed Thud
 Thud (media company), a satirical media company founded by Elon Musk
 THUD (US House subcommittee), informal name of a U.S. House subcommittee
 THUD (US Senate subcommittee), informal name of a U.S. Senate subcommittee
 Thud experiment, a 1973 study into the validity of psychiatric diagnosis

See also